The Wheelchair Basketball competition of the 2008 Summer Paralympics is held in Beijing National Indoor Stadium and Beijing Science and Technology University Gymnasium between September 7, 2008 and September 16, 2008. There will be two medals awarded in this event.

Medalists

Source: Paralympic.org

Classification
Classification is an important element that will ensure athletes can compete in a fair situation.

A certain committee will give athletes who can take part in this sport an eight-level-score specific to basketball, ranging from 1 to 4.5. Lower scores represent a larger disability. The sum score of all players on the court cannot exceed 14.

Teams

There will be 12 male teams and 10 female teams taking part in this sport.

Men's

Women's

Competition format
Both men's and women's use the same format, team divided into 2 groups, 6 each for men's and 5 each for women's, with a single round robin tournament, then first four of each group compete for 1st-8th place with knock-out format, while last one for women's and last two for men's compete for 9th-10th or 9th-12th place.

See also
Basketball at the 2008 Summer Olympics

References

External links
Official site of the 2008 Summer Paralympics

 
2008
wheelchair basketball
Paralympics
International basketball competitions hosted by China
2008–09 in Chinese basketball